Vachellia caven var. stenocarpa is a perennial tree native, and found in Argentina and Paraguay.

References

caven var. stenocarpa
Trees of Argentina
Trees of Paraguay